Karin Rahamim (born 23 June 1989) is an Israeli footballer who plays as a forward for Israeli club Kiryat Gat and has appeared for the Israel women's national team.

Career
Rahamim has been capped for the Israel national team, appearing for the team during the 2019 FIFA Women's World Cup qualifying cycle.

References

External links
 
 
 

1989 births
Living people
Israeli women's footballers
Israel women's international footballers
Women's association football forwards
Footballers from Ashkelon